Acacia genistifolia, commonly known as spreading wattle or early wattle is a species of Acacia in the family Fabaceae that is native to south eastern Australia.

Description
It blooms between late summer and spring producing inflorescences with cream or pale yellow coloured flowers that are found in spherical shaped clusters appearing in the phyllode axils. The simple inflorescences mostly occur in groups of two to four and the flower-heads contain 12 to 25 flowers.

Distribution
The shrub is endemic to south eastern New South Wales, eastern Victoria and eastern Tasmania as a part of open forest or heath communities. The plants range extends from around Dubbo in the north down through the Australian Capital Territory to the Grampians in Victoria. The species is more common in north eastern Tasmania including Bruny and Flinders Islands.

See also
 List of Acacia species

References

genistifolia
Fabales of Australia
Flora of Victoria (Australia)
Flora of Tasmania
Flora of New South Wales
Plants described in 1822